The Irish state has officially approved the following List of National Monuments in County Dublin and the city of Dublin. In the Republic of Ireland, a structure or site may be deemed to be a "National Monument", and therefore worthy of state protection unless the government decides to demolish it. If the land adjoining the monument is essential to protect it, this land may also be protected.

National Monuments 

|}

Sources 
 National Monuments in Dublin, County and City

Dublin
National Monuments